is a Japanese adventure anime film series (sometimes referred to as OVAs) produced by Toei Animation. Celebrating the 15th anniversary of the Digimon franchise, the six-part series serves as a direct sequel to the first two television series, Digimon Adventure and Digimon Adventure 02 and follows the high school years of the first eight "Digi-Destined".

The first film, Reunion was released on November 21, 2015, and the latest, Future, was released on May 5, 2018 in Japan, simultaneously in a three-week limited release in a dozen theaters nationwide, along with a limited Blu-ray release and a premium digital distribution. These films were simulcast worldwide outside of Japan through Crunchyroll in the original version with subtitles on the same day as their domestic Japanese release, in an episodic format with four or five episodes each. 

The films were also localized with English and German dubbing for events or direct-to-video exploitation; Toei presented the project to industry professionals several years in a row, but failed to sell it to other markets. Adventure tri. received generally negative reviews from critics.

Plot 
The film series is set six years after Digimon Adventure and takes place in 2005. A mysterious anomaly is causing distortions in the Real World and Digimon are being plagued by a virus that turns them hostile. These circumstances lead to the eight original DigiDestined being reunited with their partner Digimon. Joined by a mysterious DigiDestined named Meiko Mochizuki and her partner Meicoomon, they are set to solve the mystery of the infected Digimon and deal with the responsibility of growing up.

List of films 
The films were streamed outside Japan in the original language with subtitles on the same day they were released domestically, divided into four or five episodes each. The theme song for the original Japanese version is "Butter-Fly (tri. version)" by Kōji Wada, while the English version has the theme song titled "Digimon Are Back (Again!)", performed by John Majkut. The reason of this change is because of licensing issues.

The first film, was released in Japan on November 21, 2015, Indonesia on August 3, 2016, North America on September 15, 2016, and Germany and Austria on May 21, 2017. It was released on region-free DVD and Blu-ray in Japan on December 18, 2015, the U.S. on May 16, 2017, the UK on May 22, 2017, Australia on July 19, 2017, and Germany on August 7, 2017.

The second film, was released in Japan on March 12, 2016, as well as Germany and Austria on July 2, 2017. It was released on region-free DVD and Blu-ray in Japan on April 2, 2016, the U.S. at Anime Expo from July 1, 2017 through July 4, 2017 as well as San Diego Comic-Con from July 19, 2017 through July 23, 2017, ahead of a general release on August 15, 2017, Germany on October 9, 2017, the UK at MCM London Comic Con from October 27, 2017 through October 29, 2017, ahead of a general release on November 6, 2017, and Australia on February 21, 2018.

The third film, was released in Japan on September 24, 2016, North America on July 1, 2017, and Germany and Austria on August 13, 2017. It was released on region-free DVD and Blu-ray in Japan on November 2, 2016, Germany on October 30, 2017, the U.S. on December 5, 2017, the UK on December 18, 2017, and Australia on March 7, 2018.

The fourth film, was released in Japan on February 25, 2017 and North America on February 1, 2018. It was released on region-free DVD and Blu-ray in Japan on April 4, 2017, the U.S. on April 24, 2018, the UK on April 30, 2018, and Australia on August 15, 2018.

The fifth film, was released in Japan on September 30, 2017 and North America on May 10, 2018. It was released on region-free DVD and Blu-ray in Japan on November 2, 2017, the U.S. at Anime Expo on July 5, 2018 through July 8, 2018, ahead of a general release on August 7, 2018, the UK on July 30, 2018, and Australia on November 1, 2018.

The last film, was released in Japan on May 5, 2018 and North America on September 20, 2018. It was released on region-free DVD and Blu-ray in Japan on June 2, 2018, the UK on December 3, 2018, the U.S. on December 4, 2018, and Australia on March 6, 2019.

The films were streamed in episodic format outside Japan by Crunchyroll, Hulu, AnimeLab, and Tubi TV, while Eleven Arts and Shout! Factory are distributing the English-language films.

Voice cast 

The series features the eight  and partner Digimon from the original television series. The English dub uses the localized names in Saban Entertainment's English adaptation of the series, while Crunchyroll's subtitled release of the films uses Japanese names for human characters and English names for the Digimon. Some members from the original Japanese and English cast of Digimon Adventure and Digimon Adventure 02 returned to reprise their roles.

This was Philece Sampler's final role as Mimi before her death on July 1, 2021.

Development 
A new series was first announced at an event celebrating the 15th anniversary of Digimon Adventure on August 1, 2014. Basic story details were announced on September 7, 2014, after enough fans participated in a game on the official website. On December 13, 2014, Toei Animation announced the series' title, Digimon Adventure tri., with Keitaro Motonaga directing, Yūko Kakihara as screenwriter, and Atsuya Uki as character designer. The series features the returning cast of all eight main Digimon partners from the original series. A continuous stream of all of the original Digimon Adventure episodes was held on Niconico on May 4, 2015, followed by an announcement regarding the new cast for the DigiDestined and broadcast details on May 6, 2015. Daisuke Namikawa and Yūko Kaida joined the cast for the series on September 18, 2015.

On May 6, 2015, it was announced that tri. would be a six-part theatrical film series instead of a television series. The screenwriting team split and arranged important events into six interwoven parts, focusing on the main story while developing the characters' perspectives simultaneously. Motonaga utilized new computer techniques while preserving the atmosphere of the original series.

The first film, Reunion, was released on November 21, 2015. The second film, Determination, was released on March 12, 2016. The third film, Confession, was released on September 24, 2016. The fourth film, Loss, was released on February 25, 2017. The fifth film, Coexistence, was released on September 30, 2017. The last film, Future, was released on May 5, 2018. The films are being streamed outside Japan by Crunchyroll, Hulu, AnimeLab and Tubi TV, as they are released in Japan, with each film split into four or five episodes. The films can also be found on Vudu in their entirety for free with ads.  Indonesian cinemas CGV Blitz, Cinemaxx, and Platinum Cineplex ran Reunion in their respective theaters nationwide on August 3, 2016. KSM Anime ran Reunion in over 150 cinemas throughout Germany and Austria on May 21, 2017. Germany and Austria also saw theatrical releases of Determination on July 2, 2017 and Confession on August 13, 2017.

English-language version 
An English-language version of Digimon Adventure tri. was distributed in North America by Eleven Arts. The English version uses localized names from Saban Brands' release of the original television series, and reunites several voice actors from the original cast. Eleven Arts CEO Ko Mori stated that the English dub will resemble the Japanese version in tone and style but features a remixed version of the English opening theme. With the exception of "Digimon Are Back (Again!)" replacing "Butter-Fly (tri. version)", the Japanese score as well as "Brave Heart (tri. version)" and "I Wish (tri. version)" were kept in the dub.

Reunion premiered at a Fathom Events screening on September 15, 2016 and was released in select North American theaters from September 17, 2016 through October 6, 2016. On January 17, 2017, Shout! Factory announced that they acquired broadcast and home media distribution rights for the first three films, and plan for a dual-language release on DVD, Blu-ray and EST. Confession premiered at an Anime Expo screening on July 1, 2017. On October 26, 2017, Shout! Factory confirmed the release of the remaining films in 2018: Loss premiered on February 1, Coexistence on May 10, and Future on September 20. Reunion was televised January 2, 2018 on Starz Kids & Family and is available for streaming via Starz on Demand. The English dubbed movies are available for rental on Hoopla, as part of a digital distribution deal Cinedigm has with Shout! Factory. The films were added on Steam in North America. The films are also being streamed outside Japan by Crunchyroll.

Stage play adaptation 
A stage play adaptation of  ran at the Zepp Blue Theater Roppongi in Tokyo from August 5, 2017 through August 13, 2017. The play was produced by Polygon Magic, with Kenichi Tani serving as script writer and director. The male cast included Gaku Matsumoto as Tai Kamiya, Shohei Hashimoto as Matt Ishida, Kaisei Kamimura as Izzy Izumi, Junya Komatsu as Joe Kido, and Kenta Nomiyama as T.K. Takaishi. The female cast included Suzuka Morita as Sora Takenouchi, Marina Tanoue as Mimi Tachikawa, and Yūna Shigeishi as Kari Kamiya. The Digimon cast featured Oreno Graffiti as Etemon and the original voice actors for the eight partner Digimon. The play had a runtime of 150 minutes which included a 10-minute intermission. Niconico livestreamed an August 12 and August 13 showing of the play, the recording of these performances were available until September 20, 2017. It was released on DVD in Japan on December 2, 2017. An August 13 showing of the play was televised on WOWOW Live in Japan on January 14, 2018 and August 2, 2018.

Music 
Kōji Wada returned to perform the theme song "Butter-Fly (tri. version)", while Ayumi Miyazaki performs the insert song, "Brave Heart (tri. version)". The theme song for the English dub is "Digimon Are Back (Again!)" by John Majkut. The ending theme song for Reunion is "I wish (tri. version)" by Ai Maeda. The ending theme song for Determination is "Seven (tri. version)" by Wada. The ending theme for Loss is "keep on (tri. version)" by Ai Maeda. The ending theme for Future, as well as the final part of the film, is "Butter-Fly (tri. version)" by the DigiDestined, Digimon Singers, Ayumi Miyazaki, Ai Maeda, and Wada.

Reception

Box office, sales 
The first movie earned ¥59 million (about US$480,000) for 36,000 tickets in its opening weekend in Japan. On January 4, 2016, it earned ¥229 million (about US$1.95 million). Reunion had a box office gross of ¥230 million (about US$2.3 million). 

The second film earned ¥30 million (about US$265,000) on its first day of screening in Japan, surpassing the day-one box office results of Reunion and earning ¥46 million (about US$407,000) on its opening weekend. On March 31, 2016, it earned ¥144 million (about US$1.29 million). Determination had a box office gross of ¥160 million (about US$1.6 million). 

The third movie earned ¥55 million (about US$540,000) within the first four days of its theatrical run. Confession had a box office gross of ¥120 million (about US$1.15 million). 

The fourth movie earned ¥61 million (about US$533,000) within the first six days of its theatrical run. 

The fifth movie earned ¥94 million (about US$835,000) within the first seventeen days of its theatrical run. Coexistence had a box office gross of ¥100 million (about US$882,457).

In physical sales in Japan, as of January 24, 2016, the first film sells 12,809 Blu-rays and 4,201 DVDs, as of April 17, 2016 the 2nd film sells 11,543 Blu-rays and 37,58 DVDs, as of November 13, 2016 the 3rd film sells 9,677 Blu-rays and 2,738 DVDs, the 4th as of April 16, 2017 8,306 Blu-rays and 2,878 DVDs, as of November 2017 the 5th film sells 6,047 Blu-rays and 2,130 DVDs and as of June 17, 2018, the final film sells 5,994 Blu-rays and 2,113 DVDs in the limited release.

In the U.S., the first film had a box office gross of $190,581; the fourth film Loss had a US gross of $59,114; the fifth film Coexistence had a US gross of $52,339 and the final film Future had a US box office gross of $54,324.

In Germany, the first movie earned €130,000 for 10,600 tickets sold and €130,304 in Austria for 1,500 tickets. The 2nd film climbed to 24th place in the German box office with 8,400 tickets sold. The 4th film has 7,747 admissions and reached 14th place. The 5th film earned a little less than €80 000 for 6 150 tickets sold, reaching the 18th place in the German box office.  The final film sold 6,290 tickets.

Critical reception 
Jacob Chapman of Anime News Network gave the first part, Reunion, a B rating. In his review, he praised the film for its production values and heartwarming fanservice to old-school Digimon fans but noted that very little happens during the first film. He also criticized the episodic format used for streaming, feeling the "episodes" were split up at awkward points in the story due to the film's slow pacing. In his review of the English dub, Chapman described it as an "incredible nostalgia bomb" and praised the performances of the returning cast members. However, he acknowledged that some of the new voice actors had to acclimate to their roles and felt that Vic Mignogna's distinctive voice and extensive anime resume hurt his portrayal of Matt. Chapman also noticed that while the dub featured localized names and a new opening theme, the script remained faithful to the original Japanese version.

For the second film, Determination, Chapman gave a B+ rating. In his review, he praised Mimi and Joe's character development, noting that it was done without neglecting the rest of the cast. He also appreciated the plot twist ending. However, he criticized the drop in animation quality and the lack of combat scenes in comparison to the previous installment. For the third film, Confession, Chapman gave an A rating. In his review, he praised the writing for all the characters as well as the themes exploring the complexity of adolescence. He also notes that the production values have improved from the previous two films. However, he criticized again the animation quality and the lack of combat scenes.  For the fourth film, Loss, Chapman gave a C rating. In his review, he found the story to be compelling despite the flawed execution of the plot. He criticized the writing for Sora's character development and felt that her conflict with Biyomon was contrived. Moreover, he was disturbed by Gennai's behavior towards Sora and Meiko. Overall, he noted a drop in animation and production values but praised the animation quality of the combat scenes. 

Writing for the French newspaper Le Monde, Yonathan Bartak describes Digimon Adventure tri. as the creation of a "stakhanovist producer who prioritizes quantity over quality, employing animators with too little time, and an outsourced universe", journalist Benjamin Benoit speaks about a foreseeable disappointment "Failed animations, stammering rhythm, an almost non-existent scenario, the whole is reminiscent of the worst moments of the first episodes of the original series."

Writing for Anime News Network, Michael Basile stated that Adventure tri. was failure and a production with a deceptively mature approach after its brief shocking moments, "Drifting away from a group of friends, being unable to let go of the past, having to think about your future and the sacrifices you need to make to achieve your dream – all of these are interesting ideas that are perfect for a  story to explore, but each one gets dropped before it reaches a satisfying conclusion in favor of an ever-complexifying plot and enough technobabble to make sound simple by comparison."

Writing for Den of Geek, Shamus Kelley cited Adventure tri. as a failure, criticizing the writing style and convoluted resolutions, the excessive fan service, the use of characters only to "spouting off pointless anime platitudes," and its lack of ambition and innovation, "It feels like every movie in this series was made independent of each other. Sure there are cool scenes and moments in all of the films but when viewed as a whole they don’t thematically tie together. They don’t even emotionally tie together."

Notes

References

External links 

 
 Official website (stage play)
 
 
 
 
 
 

Adventure tri.
Film series introduced in 2015
2.5D musicals
Adventure anime and manga
Animated adventure films
Anime and manga about parallel universes
Anime series
Digimon films
Fantasy anime and manga
Films set in 2005
IMAX films
Japanese 3D films
Japanese film series
Japanese sequel films
Films about parallel universes
Science fiction anime and manga
Toei Animation films